Shadman is a surname and a masculine given name. Notable people with the name include:

Surname
 Ali Shadman (born 1996), Iranian actor
 Fakhreddin Shadman (1907–1967), Iranian scholar and politician

Given name
 Shadman Islam (born 1995), Bangladeshi cricketer

Bangladeshi masculine given names
Surnames of Iranian origin